The Bullish conger (Bathycongrus bullisi) is an eel in the family Congridae (conger/garden eels). It was described by David G. Smith and Robert H. Kanazawa in 1977, originally under the genus Rhechias. It is a marine, deep water-dwelling eel which is known from the Gulf of Mexico to the Amazon, in the western Atlantic Ocean. It dwells at a depth range of 366–475 meters. Males can reach a maximum total length of 39.5 centimeters.

Etymology
The eel was named in honor of marine biologist Harvey R. Bullis, Jr. (1924-1992), of the National Marine Fisheries Service.

References

Bathycongrus
Taxa named by David G. Smith
Taxa named by Robert H. Kanazawa
Fish described in 1977